The Black was a brass era American automobile, built in Indianapolis, Indiana, in 1899.

See also 
List of defunct United States automobile manufacturers
List of automobile manufacturers
List of car brands

Notes

References
Wise, David Burgess. The New Illustrated Encyclopedia of Automobiles. 

Brass Era vehicles
Defunct motor vehicle manufacturers of the United States
1900s cars
History of Indianapolis
Defunct companies based in Indiana
Motor vehicle manufacturers based in Indiana